Robert Carter Cook (April 9, 1898 – January 7, 1991) was an American geneticist and demographer. He was editor of the Journal of Heredity for 40 years, a lecturer in medical genetics and biology at George Washington University, and director, then president, of the Population Reference Bureau in Washington, D.C. He was involved with the eugenics movement of the first half of the 20th century, and an authority on population policy and the effects of population growth on the environment.

References
 

1898 births
1991 deaths
American demographers
American geneticists
Academic journal editors
George Washington University faculty
Scientists from Washington, D.C.